Threlkeld is a civil parish in the Eden District, Cumbria, England.  It contains 14 listed buildings that are recorded in the National Heritage List for England.  All the listed buildings are designated at Grade II, the lowest of the three grades, which is applied to "buildings of national importance and special interest".  The parish is in the Lake District National Park, and contains the village of Threlkeld, but mainly consists of countryside, moorland and fells.  The listed buildings include houses, farmhouses and farm buildings, a church, a bridge, and a public house.


Buildings

References

Citations

Sources

Lists of listed buildings in Cumbria